Fredrik Karl Kristian Högberg, born 5 February 1971 in Vellinge, Sweden, is a Swedish composer and producer. He resides in the old courthouse in Nyland, Ångermanland (mid-Sweden).

Fredrik Högberg grew up in Svedala, southern Sweden, and studied at the Folk High School of Framnäs, Piteå 1987–1991. Högberg has studied composition mainly with professor Jan Sandström at Piteå School of Music (a part of Luleå University of Technology).
He earned a licentiate degree in performing arts at Luleå University of Technology 2012. He teaches composition at Piteå School of Music since 2015.

Life and career 

From the early 2000 Högberg has worked mainly with works that contains multimedia, like the music film Brassbones – a brass western (2001) and the concertos Ice Concerto (2012) and The Accordion King (2014).

Works like Dancing with Silent Purpose and Rocky Island Boat Bay are examples of Högberg's humorous approach to his musical creation, and his inclination to combine contemporary art music with elements of popular music.

Högberg's work is sometimes controversial; while working with the Ice Concerto Högberg shot burning pianos being dropped from 40 metres onto the ice of Ångermanälven. He was charged with environmental crimes, which were later dropped. 2016 he wrote the music (in collaboration with singer/songwriter Nicolai Dunger) for the critically acclaimed opera Stilla min eld, inspired by the circumstances of Eva Rausings death in Belgravia, London, 2012.

Högberg can be said to have embraced the instrumental theatre of the 1960s in many of his works, for example Subadobe (1992/1994), for trombone, and Baboon Concerto (2018), for bassoon and orchestra.

Fredrik Högberg has collaborated with soloists as, among others, Christian Lindberg, Anders Paulsson, Jörgen Sundeqvist, Niklas Sivelöv, Øystein Baadsvik, Ole Edvard Antonsen and Martin Fröst, and many international orchestras and ensembles which has led to several acclaimed works.

Högberg's production is published by Gehrman's musikförlag, Stockholm. His trombone music is published by Edition Tarrodi.

Awards 

Högberg has won numerous awards and stipends. In 2006 he received one of the biggest grant to-date given to a Swedish composer, €200,000, to develop the first virtual opera house on the internet – iOPERA. In 2014 his piano concerto Ice Concerto was nominated to the Nordic Council Music Award.

List of works

Solo Instrument 
 Subadobe 1-4 – four pieces for solo trombone, 1992/94
 Subadobe 5 – solo trombone & backstage trombone, 1994
 Erotikmusik – for piano, 1995
 Cloud Balloon – for Clarinet in Bb, 1996
 Flight of the Dragonfly – for flute, 1996
 Malin the Worker's Waltz – for accordion, 2014
Krom – for alto flute, 2017

Chamber music 
 Danser från Helikons källor (Dances from the sources of Helicon) – for brass quintet, 1995/2002
 Hubbeli-Bubbeli – for brass quintet, 1995
 John & Clint – for trombone och bass trombone, 1995
 Pulsmusikk – for optional Bb- or C-instrument and drumkit, 1997
 The Ballad of Kit Bones – western drama for trombone sextet, 1998
 The Bubble Tune – for accordion and organ, 1998/2003
 Kroum Song – for percussion ensemble, 1998
 Melancholy Tango – for brass quintet, 2000
 Play 'em High – western drama för trombone sextet and narrator, 2002 (Fredrik Högberg & Christian Lindberg)
 Déjà Vu – for clarinet, trombone, percussion, vibraphone, double bass and piano, 2004
 Dancing According To Me – for two accordion, 2006
 More is More – for string quartet, 2006

Tape/multimedia 
 Movements of Infinity "The Aquarium concerto" – tape & live hydrophonics, 1992 (Fredrik Högberg & Niklas Breman)
 Minds 'n Pictures – tape, video & soloists, 1993
 Tiden snöar från trädet (Time snows from the tree) – tape, 1994
 Sensualle – film music, 1995
 Plastmusikk – for optional instrument in C or Bb, backtrack and optional percussion, 1995
 Popmusikk – for optional Bb- or C-instrument and backtrack, 1996/99
 Visible Duet – for soprano, optional Bb- or C-instrument och backtrack, 2003
 Bogo Bogo – for oboe (or optional Bb- or C-instrument) and tape, 2004
 Ice Piano (Ice Breaker) – two pieces for piano and backtrack, 2010

Film 
 Brassbones – a brass western (2001) – composer, co-director
 The adventures of Kundraan – a symphonic tale in three parts based on the life and music of Christian Lindberg, 2017 (post production director & creative editor)

Works for orchestra

Concertos 
 Head Concerto – for trombone and symphonic wind orchestra, 1995
 Concerto for Soprano Saxophone and Orchestra, 1998
 Concertino for Soprano Saxophone and String orchestra, 2000
 The Return of Kit Bones – Trombone concerto no. 1, 2001
 The Poem – Concerto for trumpet and orchestra, 2004–05
 Trolltuba – Concerto for tuba and symphonic wind orchestra, 2005
 Rocky Island Boat Bay – Concerto for tuba and orchestra 2006
 Hitting the First Base – Concerto for double bass and string orchestra, 2008
 Konzert für zwei Posaunen – for two trombones and chamber orchestra, 2008/2012
 Silent Purpose – Concerto for clarinet, string orchestra, backtrack and optional video projections, 2008
 Dancing with Silent Purpose – Concerto for clarinet, string orchestra and backtrack, 2010
 Ice Concerto – for piano, orchestra, backtrack and video projection, 2012
 The Accordion King – Concerto for accordion, orchestra and video projection, 2014
Absent Illusions – Concerto for violin, orchestra and video projection, 2017
Baboon Concerto – Concerto for bassoon and orchestra, 2018

Orchestra 
 Chords 'n Anger – for orchestra, 1993
 Strings & Sadness – for string orchestra/quintet, 1993
 Little Suite for Orchestra (dedicated to Winnie the Poh), 1993/94
 Music for Strings – for string orchestra, 1998
 Tre gnostiska danser (Three gnostic dances) – for orchestra, 1999/2000
 The Latin Kings & Orchestra, 2000 (Fredrik Högberg; lyrics: Dogge Doggelito)

Ballet music 
 Higgins & Mr. Wrengengengengeng – a music tale/ballet for narrator and orchestra, 1993/2005
 Subtrain Eroticism – for chamber orchestra, 1994–95
 Subtrain Eroticism II – tape, percussion & trombone, 1996–97
 In-Vita – tape & four singers, 1997
 Excavating Ascent – tape, 1999
 Standing Waves – for orchestra, 1999
 Slice of Time – for percussion ensemble, 2003

Vocal music

Choir 
 Erotica – mixed choir, 1992
 Chuang-tse och fjärilen (Chuang-tse and the butterfly) – chamber ensemble, choir & soprano, 1994
 Jag är rädd, andas på mig (I am afraid, breathe on me) – choir & tape, 1995
 Barents Hymn – choir & wind orchestra, 1998
 Svenskt Mantra (Swedish Mantra) – choir & tape, 2002
The Fisherman – for 16-part vocal ensemble, 2014

Vocals and chamber ensemble 
 Melodram – for baritone and saxophone quartet, 2013
 Sagan om Vintern (A Winter Tale) – music tale for chamber ensemble & singers, 1997

Choir and orchestra 
 Älvdans och himlasång (River dances and heavenly singing) – Music inspired by old folk tradition for choir, organ and orchestra, 2000

Opera 
 Woman of Cain – A tale of a family in the dawn of civilization. Opera for soloists, choir and orchestra, 2001/2009 (libretto: Tove Alsterdal)
 Stilla min eld (Still my fire) – Opera about Hans Kristian Rausing and Eva Rausing, 2016 (libretto: Alexander Onofri & Kerstin Gezelius)

Vocals and orchestra 
 Suite from The Woman of Cain – for soprano, baritone and orchestra, 2008 (lyrics: Tove Alsterdal)

External links 
Fredrik Högberg's website
Fredrik Högberg's  profile at Gehrmans förlag.
Edition Tarrodi
Luleå tekniska universitet
Brassbones

References 

1971 births
20th-century classical composers
20th-century Swedish male musicians
21st-century classical composers
21st-century Swedish male musicians
Living people
Luleå University of Technology alumni
Male musical theatre composers
Male opera composers
Swedish classical composers
Swedish male classical composers
Swedish musical theatre composers
Swedish opera composers
Academic staff of the Luleå University of Technology